The Blackfeet Nation, officially named the Blackfeet Tribe of the Blackfeet Indian Reservation of Montana, is a federally recognized tribe of Siksikaitsitapi people with an Indian reservation in Montana. Tribal members primarily belong to the Piegan Blackfeet (Ampskapi Piikani) band of the larger Blackfoot Confederacy that spans Canada and the United States.

The Blackfeet Indian Reservation is located east of Glacier National Park and borders the Canadian province of Alberta. Cut Bank Creek and Birch Creek form part of its eastern and southern borders. The reservation contains 3,000 square miles (7,800 km2), twice the size of the national park and larger than the state of Delaware. It is located in parts of Glacier and Pondera counties.

History 
The Blackfeet settled in the region around Montana beginning in the 17th century. Previously, they resided in an area of the woodlands north and west of the Great Lakes. Pressure exerted by British traders at James Bay in present day Canada on the Algonquin-speaking tribes in the area drove the Blackfeet out onto the Northern Plains. They eventually acquired firearms and horses, and became a formidable example of the classic Plains Indian culture. They were a powerful force, controlling an area that extended from current day Edmonton, Alberta Province, nearly to Yellowstone National Park, and from Glacier Park to the Black Hills of South Dakota. The Badger-Two Medicine area is a significant sacred site for the tribe. 

In the late 19th century, Blackfeet territory was encroached on by European Americans and Canadians, and various branches of the people were forced to cede lands and ultimately move to smaller Indian reservations in the United States and reserves in Canada. The Badger-Two Medicine area is sacred to the Blackfeet people. This sacred part of the Rocky Mountain Front was excluded from Blackfeet lands in a Treaty of 1896, but they reserved access, hunting and fishing rights. Since the early 1980s, when the Bureau of Land Management approved drilling rights leases without consultation with the tribe, the Blackfeet have worked to protect this sacred area, where they practiced their traditional religious rituals.

The United States federal government suspended all leasing activities for drilling in this area in the 1990s, and in 2007 the Bush administration made permanent a moratorium on issuing new permits. Many leaseholders had already relinquished their leases, and in November 2016 the Department of Interior announced the cancellation of the 15 drilling rights leases held by Devon Energy Corporation in the Badger-Two Medicine area. The Blackfeet had documented that the area was not a "wilderness," as the Bob Marshall Wilderness Complex was designated in 1964, but a "human landscape" shaped by and integral to their culture.

Geography 
Adjacent mountains include Ninaki Mountain and Papoose. The eastern part of the reservation is mostly open hills of grassland, while a narrow strip along the western edge is covered by forests of fir and spruce. Free-ranging cattle are present in several areas, sometimes including on roadways.

Several waterways drain the area with the largest being the St. Mary River, Two Medicine River, Milk River, Birch Creek and Cut Bank Creek.

The reservation is east of the Lewis and Clark National Forest in Montana, which contains the Badger-Two Medicine area, sacred to the Blackfeet people. The Badger-Two Medicine area is at the Rocky Mountain Front of the national forest. The Blackfeet call the Rocky Mountains the "Backbone of the World". Their names for peaks include Morning Star, Poia, Little Plume, Running Crane, Spotted Eagle, Kiyo, Scarface, Elkcalf Bullshoe, and Curly Bear.

Demographics

The 2010 census reported a population of 10,405 living on the reservation lands. The population density is 3.47 people per square mile (1.34 people/km²).

The Blackfeet Nation has 16,500 enrolled members. The main community is Browning, Montana, which is the seat of tribal government. Other towns serve the tourist economy along the edge of the park: St. Mary and East Glacier Park Village, which has an Amtrak passenger station and the historic Glacier Park Lodge. Small communities include Babb, Kiowa, Blackfoot, Seville, Heart Butte, Starr School, and Glacier Homes.

Communities
Babb
Browning
East Glacier Park Village
Heart Butte
Little Browning
North Browning
St. Mary
South Browning
Starr School

Culture
The tribe has an oral history of 10,000 years in this region. It recounts the sacred nature of their central place, the Badger-Two Medicine area, known as their site of creation and origin.

The Rocky Mountain Front near Birch Creek The Badger-Two Medicine is "covered by the Treaty of 1896, which gives Blackfeet tribal members the right to hunt and fish in any portion of the area in accordance with state law and cut wood for domestic use. Blackfeet treaty claims as well as spiritual and cultural uses of the Badger-Two Medicine are pre-existing rights ... Blackfeet tribal members have used the Badger-Two Medicine and its waters for hundreds of years for vision quests and for other religious and cultural purposes."

In 2002, the Department of Interior declared roughly two-thirds — almost 90,000 acres (36,000 ha) — of the Badger-Two Medicine area along the Rocky Mountain Front as eligible for listing as a Traditional Cultural District in the National Register of Historic Places. This was a recognition of its importance to the Blackfeet. They used an ethnographer to document their oral history of use and practices, and in 2014 used this information to negotiate with stakeholders over leases for drilling rights that had been made in the area.

The nation celebrates North American Indian Days, an annual festival held on pow wow grounds, near the Museum of the Plains Indian in Browning. Adjacent to the reservation's eastern edge is the city of Cut Bank.

Economy
Because of its isolated location, residents of the reservation have suffered high unemployment. As of May 2016, the Montana Local Area Unemployment Statistics (LAUS) Program Preliminary Non-Seasonally Adjusted Data reports the rate is 11.0% on the reservation (for comparison, at the same time, unemployment was 3.6% for Montana and 4.5% for the U.S.).

In 2001, the BIA reported 69 percent unemployment among registered members of the tribe. Among those who were employed that year, 26% earned less than the poverty guideline.

The major income source of the reservation is petroleum and natural gas leases on the oil fields on tribal lands. In 1982, there were 643 producing oil wells and 47 producing gas wells.

The reservation also has a significant tourist industry. Other economic activities include ranching and a small lumber industry, which supported the Blackfeet Indian Writing Company pencil factory in Browning.

Farms located at least partially on the reservation reported a total income of $9 million in 2002. A total of 354 farms covered , the majority of the reservation's land. Most of these farms or ranches were family-owned, including the 198 farms owned by Native Americans.

Eighty percent of the land was used for raising beef cattle, which produced eighty percent of farm income. Other livestock included hogs, and chickens, with only small numbers of dairy cattle, bison, horses, and sheep.

Of the  used for growing crops, only , or 13%, were irrigated. Crops raised included wheat, barley, and hay with a smaller amount of oats.
  
Members of the tribe work seasonally in wildfire firefighting, a source of considerable individual income. In 2000, some 1,000 Blackfeet worked as firefighters, including the elite Chief Mountain Hotshots team. Firefighting income brought in $6.1 million that year. However, this income is highly variable depending on the severity of the wildfire season.

On April 30, 2010, the Blackfeet Tribal Business Council (BTBC) approved three major initiatives totaling $5.5 million. The revenue was to be derived from payments for oil exploration from Newfield Production Co. The BTBC approved a $200 special per capita payments for all 16,500 members, initial funding for a new grocery store in Browning, and more than $1 million for land acquisition within the reservation to return property to tribal control.

Government

The Blackfeet Nation runs the sovereign government on the reservation through its elected Tribal Business Council. For many years Earl Old Person led the council.  Old Person was also the honorary chief of the tribe. It provides most services, including courts, child welfare, employment assistance, wildlife management, health care, education, land management, and senior services, as well as garbage collection and water systems. They worked with the federal Bureau of Indian Affairs to replace native police with federal officers in 2003 because of problems in the local force.

The reservation includes several types of land use. The remaining  are Fee lands, which is taxable and may be privately owned by the tribe, tribe members or non-tribe members.

The tribe leases some of its communal land for homes, farms, grazing, and commercial uses. They offer leases to tribe members prior to non-members. The tribe has the right of first refusal; all private land offered for sale within the reservation must be offered to the tribe first. If they decline to purchase it, they grant a waiver permitting purchase by non-Native parties.

Transportation
There are no paved north-south roads in Glacier National Park. Access to sites on the east side of the park is provided by U.S. Route 89, which runs through the reservation to the Canada–US border, crossing near Chief Mountain. It provides access to the Canadian sister national park, Waterton Lakes. Both east-west routes for the park travel through the reservation, as does the passenger train service on Amtrak's Empire Builder. Several hiking trails continue out of the park and across the reservation; they require Blackfeet-issued permits for use.

Notable people
 Gordon Belcourt (1945–2013), Executive Director of the Montana-Wyoming Tribal Leaders Council
 Black Lodge Singers, powwow singers and drum group
 Elouise P. Cobell (1945–2011), tribal treasurer and founder of Blackfeet Nation Bank. She identified mismanagement of trust land fees by the departments of Interior and Treasury, and sought corrections in Washington. In 1996 she filed a class-action suit against the government in what is known as Cobell v. Salazar, settled by the federal government for $3.4 billion in 2009. The settlement provides for payment to potentially more than 250,000 plaintiffs, repurchase of lands across the country for transfer to tribal management, and a scholarship fund for Native American and Alaskan Native students.
 Richie Havens (1941–2013), singer-songwriter and guitarist
 Joe Hipp (born 1962), professional boxer
 Donna Hutchinson  (born 1949), elected as member of the Arkansas House of Representatives from Bella Vista, Arkansas, served from 2007 to 2013
 Mountain Chief (1848–1942)
 Earl Old Person (1929-2021), tribal chief and political leader
 Steve Reevis (1962–2017), actor (Geronimo: An American Legend, The Missing, Fargo) 
 Misty Upham (1982–2014), actor
 Stephen Graham Jones (born 1972), author
 Rickey Medlocke (born 1950), guitarist for Blackfoot and Lynyrd Skynyrd bands

See also
 Tipi ring, with information about study of tipi ring sites on the Blackfeet Indian Reservation
 Darrell "Dusty" Crawford learned that he has what may be the oldest DNA native to the Americas. The test revealed the origins of his Blackfeet ancestors who may have already been in the Americas about 17,000 years ago.

References

References
Farr, William E. The Reservation Blackfeet: A Photographic History of Cultural Survival. Foreword by James Welch. Seattle: University of Washington Press, 1984. 
McFee, Malcolm. Modern Blackfeet: Montanans on a Reservation. New York: Holt, Rinehart and Winston, 1972.

External links

 Blackfeet Tribal Land Department
 Official tribe website
 Blackfeet Reservation and Off-Reservation Trust Land, Montana, United States Census Bureau
 Singer/songwriter/storyteller/lecturer Jack Gladstone
 James Willard Schultz Papers, 1867-1969, University of Montana Library

American Indian reservations in Montana
 
Federally recognized tribes in the United States
Geography of Glacier County, Montana
Geography of Pondera County, Montana
Montana articles lacking sources